Il cielo in una stanza (The sky in a room) is a 1999 Italian comedy film directed by Carlo Vanzina.

Plot 
Paul hates his father because he was too strict with his son. One day Paul says to his father that he would prefer never to have been born and to live happy and carefree in the glorious 1960s. Paul is immediately satisfied by fate, and finds himself transported back into the 1960s, when his father was still a child. Paul immediately realizes that he desired nonsense from destiny, and tries to replace his trouble, knowing a young man (his father as a man), trying to make him fall in love with the girl of his dreams (the future mother of Paul).

Cast 
Elio Germano: Paolo as a teenager
Gabriele Mainetti: Marco
Ricky Tognazzi: Paolo, father of Marco 
Alessandro Cianflone: Massimo 
Francesco Venditti: Claudio 
Cinzia Mascoli: mother of Paolo 
Maurizio Mattioli: father of Paolo
Tosca D'Aquino: Lola
Cristiana Capotondi
Elisabetta Pellini
Sascha Zacharias

References

External links

1999 films
Italian comedy films
Films directed by Carlo Vanzina
1996 comedy films
1996 films
Films about time travel
1999 comedy films
1990s Italian-language films
1990s Italian films